The flag of the Central African Republic was officially adopted in 1958. It has been retained since that time with the same design, four horizontal stripes of blue, white, green and yellow, and a single vertical band of red, with a yellow five-pointed star in the upper left corner.

Design
The design consists of four horizontal stripes and one vertical stripe, and a single yellow five-pointed star in the upper left. The colours chosen are intended to be symbolic of France (blue and white) and Africa (green and yellow) with the red vertical stripe connecting them both in unity, and the respect that Europeans and Africans should have for each other. The yellow star is intended to be indicative of independence as well as a symbol of African unity, progress and tolerance The Constitution of the Central African Republic describes the flag as "four equal sized horizontal bands of the colours blue, white, green and yellow, perpendicularly barred in their centre by a red band of equal size and marked in the upper left corner by a yellow five-pointed star."

Construction sheets

Colours scheme

History

The flag of the Central African Republic was designed by Barthélemy Boganda, who would become its first president. It was originally intended to be the flag of the United States of Latin Africa, which he proposed in 1957. The flag was adopted by the Legislative Assembly of Ubangi-Shari on 1 December 1958. At the time it was introduced, Boganda stated in the national Legislative Assembly that "Those colours, which symbolize the four territories constituting the French Equatorial Africa but also our guide territory, the Metropolitan France, came out of my heart. The red stripe which crosses the four colours is the symbol of our blood. As we did it when France was in danger, we shall shed our blood for Africa and to protect the Central African Republic, member of the French Community."

President Jean-Bédel Bokassa considered the replacement of the flag in 1976, following his conversion to Islam under the influence of Libyan leader Muammar Gaddafi. The proposal was to change the flag entirely in order to feature a crescent and star prominently. However, the proposal was short-lived, as several months later the Central African Empire was created under Bokassa, as Emperor Bokassa I. On 4 December that year, a Constitution described both the emblem for the Emperor's personal use and the existing flag was re-used as that of the Empire. The personal standard of the Emperor was light green in color, with a gold-colored eagle in the centre superimposed over a 20-pointed gold star, inspired by the eagle on the imperial standard of Napoleon I.

The flag remained in place after the Central African Empire fell.

Former flags

References

External links

Flag of Central African Republic, a brief history by Flagmakers

Flags introduced in 1958
Flag
Flags of Africa
Central African Republic